Rogelio Montemayor Seguy (born August 18, 1947 Mexico City) is a Mexican politician and economist who served as the Governor of Coahuila from December 1, 1993, to November 30, 1999.

In December 1999, Montemayor was appointed the director general of Pemex, the state-owned petroleum company, following the resignation of his predecessor, Adrian Lajous Vargas.

References

Mexican businesspeople in the oil industry
Mexican business executives
Pemex
Mexican economists
1947 births
Living people
Governors of Coahuila
Institutional Revolutionary Party politicians
People from Mexico City
20th-century Mexican businesspeople
21st-century Mexican businesspeople